The Ricky Gervais Show is a comedy radio show in the UK starring Ricky Gervais, Stephen Merchant, and Karl Pilkington, later adapted into a podcast and a television series. Despite being named after the more famous Gervais, it mostly revolves around the life and ideas of Karl Pilkington. The show started in August 2001 on Xfm, and aired in weekly periods for months at a time throughout 2002, 2003, 2004, and mid-2005. In November 2005, Guardian Unlimited offered the show as a podcast series of 12 shows. Throughout January and February 2006, the podcast was consistently ranked the number one podcast in the world; it appeared in the 2007 Guinness World Record for the world's most downloaded podcast, having gained an average of 261,670 downloads per episode during its first month. According to the BBC, by September 2006, the podcasts of the series had been downloaded nearly 18 million times. , the podcast has been downloaded over 300 million times. An animated series based on the podcast and adapted for television debuted for HBO in the United States and Channel 4 in the UK in 2010.

Radio shows

Early shows 
Gervais and Merchant first worked together in radio on the London-based alternative radio station Xfm London. Their show was broadcast from January to August 1998 from 4–6pm on Sundays, and only featured Gervais and Merchant (before their collaboration on The Office). The show's original format was more interactive, with features, guests, phone-ins, and audience interaction through listeners' letters.

Return to XFM 
Gervais and Merchant returned to Xfm in August 2001, after the first series of The Office had been broadcast, with Pilkington brought in as producer. The show was originally just billed as Ricky Gervais and Stephen Merchant, and Karl's presence was not acknowledged on posters and other advertisements. Gervais and Merchant would speak to Karl about his thoughts on whatever they were talking about. In 2003 Pilkington was officially added to advertisements for the show as over the years Karl's role on the show became more prominent as Ricky and Steve were finding more amusement with his views and personal life. As the producer, Karl had input with features such as Rockbusters, Songs of Phrase, Do We Need 'em, Knob News, Cheeky Freak of the Week, Monkey News and Educating Ricky. Their last show for XFM aired on 2 July 2005, after which they chose to switch the show's format from radio to podcasting.

Series 1 
The show ran between September 2001 and May 2002 before Gervais and Merchant went on hiatus to film the second series of ‘’The Office’’. Initially, Pilkington’s on-air presence was relatively minimal compared to what it would become. Gervais and Merchant only occasionally called for Karl to weigh in with his thoughts, while the two mostly talked to each other, with the “links” between songs comprising only about 30 minutes of the show’s 2-hour run time.

As Pilkington’s personality moved to the forefront, the talk portion of the show expanded to roughly an hour per 2-hour broadcast. While the show relied largely upon a stream-of-consciousness format, Pilkington made attempts to keep things more conventional by insisting on running contests and airing pre-recorded segments and regular “features”.

Series 2 
With the second series of ‘’The Office’’ complete, Gervais, Merchant, and Pilkington returned to XFM in August of 2002 to resume their 2-hour Saturday afternoon broadcasts. Though Pilkington’s name was still not being used in promotional materials, the format mainly centered on his contributions with Gervais and Merchant mostly reacting to the various things Karl said and did, a format that would endure through the remainder of the radio broadcasts and podcasts, concluding in 2012.

This was the longest stretch of XFM shows, running 51 weeks until August 2003 when Gervais and Merchant again went on hiatus, this time to record the Christmas Special (finale) for ‘’The Office’’.

During the year, Pilkington introduced many of the show’s most notable segments including “
Monkey News”, “Rockbusters”, “Songs of Phrase”, and “The Film Thing”, among others. Karl grew increasingly frustrated with Ricky’s antagonism toward him throughout the year, and over the final few shows, suggested he did not want to continue on. Gervais and Merchant repeatedly said on air they would not return if Pilkington didn’t agree to remain with the show.

Series 3 
During the hiatus, Pilkington signed on with Gervais and Merchant’s talent agent, and negotiated a deal with XFM to get Mondays off in exchange for continuing to do The Ricky Gervais Show on Saturdays. This was a frequent topic of contention during this run with Gervais repeatedly accusing Pilkington of being lazy for demanding an entire day off on exchange for doing 2-hours of work on Saturdays.

This show began airing again in November 2003 and broadcast for 12 weeks until January 2004 when Gervais and Merchant went on hiatus to film series 1 of their new show, ‘’Extras’’.

Series 4 
Gervais, Merchant, and Pilkington returned to XFM following the completion of ‘’Extras’’ series 1. This time, they recorded only 6 shows before Gervais and Merchant left XFM for good. The show would later continue as a podcast, with no further association with XFM.

Controversies 
On the 17 November 2001 broadcast, Gervais and Merchant (despite Karl's protests) filled the show with sexual innuendos and double entendres, in which they used the word "cock" multiple times, claiming they were referring to the bird, rather than the penis. During a later show, Gervais and Merchant revealed that they had discovered that they had received a warning from the radio authority by reading an article on a news website. The pair often joked how it was acceptable to say "cock" referring to the male bird but not say "cock" referring to a penis. Such as on 2 August 2003, when Ricky brought in a tin of "Cock Soup" then he and Steve made obvious sexual innuendos about the soup, while maintaining they were referring to "cock as in the bird", and later the two played with the name of philosopher Immanuel Kant and its obvious similarity in sound to the word "cunt".

Radio 2 Holiday Shows

Gervais, Merchant and Pilkington broadcast two hour-long holiday specials on Radio 2 during the 2005 holiday season, the first airing on Christmas Eve and the second on New Year's Eve.

NME Radio show

Gervais, Merchant and Pilkington recorded a two-hour radio show as part of the test transmissions for the new radio station NME Radio. The episode aired on Monday 9 June 2008, 12pm (BST).

Podcasts

Creation

According to Emily Bell, editor-in-chief of Guardian Unlimited, Gervais and Merchant had approached the Guardian with the idea of the show. Bell believes they switched to a podcast format for greater control over content and access to a larger audience. The first 12 episodes were released free of charge through the Guardian Unlimited website.

Series one

The first series of podcasts began on 5 December 2005, and a new episode was released each Monday for the next twelve weeks. The show relies heavily on the wit and bizarre theories of Pilkington, who was now unemployed, having left his job as radio producer at XFM. The podcast focuses more on Pilkington as a primary figure of humour in the show in various ways, including questions directed at him that have been emailed in, either by fans of the show or by Gervais and Merchant themselves.

Series two

Series two of the podcast began on 28 February 2006. It consisted of 6 episodes with the final one released on 4 April 2006.  The series saw the return of Karl's Diary and Rockbusters. A new (though short-lived; it was only presented in the first episode) feature was also introduced in order to replace Pilkington's "Monkey News", called "Real Monkey News", where Gervais attempts to present facts about chimpanzees which are factual and scientific.

With the start of series two, the formerly free Ricky Gervais Show shifted to a pay model – and as a result the show is now classified as an audiobook. It is available through Audible and the iTunes Store with individual episodes. The reason for this addition, according to Ricky on the podcast, is because The Guardian agreed to pay for the bandwidth for 12 episodes, and any more extra episodes would have to be paid for out of their personal finances.

Series three

Series three of the podcasts was released on 22 August 2006. This season saw the return of Karl's Diary as well as a new feature based on Karl's attempts at Poetry. Pilkington was noticeably lethargic during this 6-episode series, having been in and out of the hospital with kidney stones and subsequent complications. This was a major focus of his diary entries during this period with Gervais and Merchant ridiculing him for his histrionics over what they noted was a minor, routine operation.

All other known features were abandoned, with the rest of each episode focusing instead on conversation. The season had the same pricing implementation as season two, although the file quality was increased from 32 kbit/s to 56 kbit/s.

At the end of the sixth episode, Gervais and Merchant agreed to put the show on an indefinite hiatus.

Series four: The Podfather Trilogy

Three free podcasts were announced that coincide with special days.  The first was released on 31 October 2006, to coincide with Halloween, the next was on 23 November, coinciding with Thanksgiving, and the last was released on 24 December 2006, to coincide with Christmas.

Fame special

A special podcast was made available as a giveaway to people who went to see Gervais' standup tour Fame, which showed from January to April 2007. It was later released for free to the public in October of that year.

Hour-Long Bonus Podcast

On 25 November 2007, Gervais, Merchant and Pilkington released a special bonus podcast for free. In it, Ricky and Steve continued to probe Karl with questions from Inside the Actors Studio. Originally released as an extra on the audio CD release of series one, it was later made available free through iTunes.

Series five

Four more episodes were released on 15 September 2008 through the iTunes Store. This series was released all at once as an Audiobook, almost two hours in length and split into four half-hour episodes. This series differs because they were recorded at the same time. There are no contests or any interaction from the listeners as the previous series contained.

The Ricky Gervais Guide to...

Series one

A new series, called The Ricky Gervais Guide to... featured the trio discussing various topics in their entirety during individual 50 min episodes. The first volume The Ricky Gervais Guide to... Medicine was released on 31 December 2008. This was followed by The Ricky Gervais Guide to... Natural History on 21 January 2009. This in turn was followed by The Ricky Gervais Guide to... The Arts on 18 February 2009. The 4th episode, The Ricky Gervais Guide to... Philosophy aired on 17 March while the 5th and final episode of season 1, The Ricky Gervais Guide to... The English followed on 21 April (2 days prior to St. George's Day).

Series two

It was announced on Gervais's blog that the first episode of the new series, The Ricky Gervais Guide to... Society, was recorded on 6 September 2009; it was released on 3 November 2009. The second audiobook of the new series, The Ricky Gervais Guide to... Law and Order, was released on 1 December 2009. A third audiobook, entitled The Ricky Gervais Guide to... The Future, was released on 29 December 2009. A fourth audiobook, entitled The Ricky Gervais Guide to... The Human Body was released on 26 January 2010. The fifth and final audiobook of the second season, entitled The Ricky Gervais Guide to... The Earth was released on 23 February 2010.

On 12 June 2010 The Ricky Gervais Guide to... The World Cup released. This was followed later that year by a podcast entitled "A day in the Life of Karl Pilkington" following a format more associated with the Ricky Gervais Show podcasts.

The Ricky Gervais Guide to... Comic Relief was released as a free podcast on 6 March 2011 in aid of Red Nose Day (18 March 2011).

A Day in the Life of Karl

A special one-off podcast titled A Day in the Life of Karl was released on 28 October 2010.

Video podcasts
On 24 March 2006, an "irregular run of free video podcasts" was launched through the iTunes podcast directory.  The video podcasts do not follow the format of the earlier audio shows and the content varies greatly from podcast to podcast.  The first video was a conversation between Pilkington and Gervais, with Gervais enthusing about the idea of Pilkington becoming a human crab or having massive reconstructive surgery.  The second podcast served as an advertisement for Pilkington and Gervais's new book, The World of Karl Pilkington (a series of excerpts from the previous podcasts and various musings and drawings produced by Karl). The third on the series was an audio clip from a previous edition of Monkey News, synchronised with a flash animation.  The fourth video podcast features a controversial audio advertisement for The Prostate Cancer Charity and Gervais talking about his Aerial Award. The fifth is Gervais and Merchant making Pilkington watch Brokeback Mountain.  The sixth podcast was another conversation over Pilkington's book The World of Karl Pilkington.  The seventh podcast was about a story Pilkington told in series one, episode one, about his bizarre journey in an abandoned asylum and rehabilitation clinic. The eighth video shows Gervais showing the viewer around the various sets during the filming of the second series of Extras, followed by Pilkington giving his opinion on Gervais's latest book, Flanimals of the Deep. The ninth was Pilkington talking about Gervais's cat; Ollie. The tenth was Gervais, Merchant and Pilkington announcing the new series of the show beginning on 22 August.

In August 2012 Ricky Gervais produced a pilot for a new series of video podcasts, titled Learn English with Ricky Gervais. The show features Gervais and Pilkington engaging in English dialogue, and translated captions have been provided in many languages by his fans.

Cancelled podcasts
In November 2010, Ricky announced that a new series of podcasts would be recorded in 2011 and a new audiobook series where Karl will be an agony aunt answering listeners' problems.
However, in October 2011 on his online blog Gervais revealed that the new audiobook will consist of Karl reading the book Flanimals written by Gervais himself. In the blog, Gervais said both himself and Stephen Merchant will be present during the reading to "help him with long words". However, this idea was eventually scrapped as well.

TV series

The Ricky Gervais Show audiobooks have been developed into The Ricky Gervais Show, an animated series which premiered on 19 February 2010, on the American channel HBO and on the British channel Channel 4 on 23 April 2010.

The show consists of past audiobooks with animation, drawn in a style similar to classic era Hanna-Barbera cartoons, describing jokes in a literal context. Series one, two and three are available on DVD and streaming services.

Recurring features and competitions

Monkey News
Monkey News was a popular feature that began in the early XFM days and was originally referred to as "Chimpanzee That". Monkey News segments typically came near the end of the broadcasts and featured Karl Pilkington relating stories of chimps (referred to by Pilkington interchangeably as "monkeys") performing absurd and often impossible feats. Some of the stories, such as the 'chimp that flew a rocket' would be highly exaggerated tales based on actual real events. The "monkey" is often a mysterious protagonist until he is revealed at the conclusion of the story, although in most cases, it is immediately obvious to Gervais, Merchant, and the audience how the monkey/chimp will figure into the tale (a segment about horse racing will have Pilkington saying that the chimp was the jockey, for example). The stories are rarely sourced by Pilkington who is always accused by Gervais of "talking shit" or possibly having extrapolated misinformation from a news story. Sometimes listeners would email Monkey News stories to Pilkington.

Despite its popularity, Monkey News almost always led to Gervais becoming furious at Pilkington for the obviously fatuous nature of the stories, which Pilkington insisted were true. He would often interrupt Pilkington to express outrage and disbelief. In one XFM show, he became so frustrated that he left the room before Karl finished the segment. Stephen Merchant was often more patient and frequently admonished Gervais by shouting, "Let him finish!" or "Shut up!", insisting that Karl be allowed to deliver the story in full. On one occasion he told Karl to cut Gervais' microphone when Ricky would not cease his interruptions. However, even Merchant has been driven to verbally abuse Karl during the most obviously nonsensical and extreme stories. Despite the far-fetched nature of Monkey News, Pilkington always insists he is accurately recounting the facts. The confrontational interactions among Gervais, Merchant, and Pilkington often result in Monkey News becoming a sort of collaborative shaggy dog story.

During their podcast, Ricky and Steve try to disprove monkey news by "casually" talking of the story being told and how the central character could not possibly be a monkey due to the need for high intelligence, specialized knowledge, or the fact that a monkey would be immediately recognized by onlookers, etc. Gervais incorrectly stated that chimpanzees do not have opposable thumbs, when trying to prove that a chimp could not use a tool to perform surgery.

On the 20 February 2006 podcast, Pilkington announced that Monkey News would no longer be a featured segment in future podcasts, claiming that there were no more Monkey News stories to report. However, it came back for a brief reprise at the end of the third series.  Monkey News was introduced on both the XFM radio show and the podcasts with a "jingle"  performed by Gervais shouting, "Ooh, Chimpanzee That! Monkey News!", which was sometimes followed by a muttered obscenity.

Knob News
Knob News has a format which is an amalgam of Monkey News and Educating Ricky. It features only in the latest 2005 XFM shows. Early versions had Ricky giving the news, though later it involved Karl giving a series of headlines of a male genital nature, from which Ricky and Steve would choose. A one-off show feature, similarly related, was Fanny Facts – where Karl presented news about or related to vaginas.

'Knob' was used as a non-offensive slang term for penis throughout. The jingle for it was Ricky shouting 'Ooh! You're gonna have someone's eye out! Knob News!' in a very similar fashion to Monkey News.

Rockbusters
Rockbusters was conceived by Karl Pilkington and was played on Ricky Gervais and Stephen Merchant's long running XFM radio show between 2002–2004 and brought back in 2005. It debuted on 12 October 2002 as a phone-in, but converted to an e-mail competition the following week. Despite punning in its title, the game has very little in common with Blockbusters. It is played as follows: Karl gives three clues, which he considers "cryptic" but are in reality convoluted colloquialisms which often depend on the answer being mispronounced. Along with the "clue", Karl includes the initials of the answer. Merchant sometimes referred to the clues as 'craptic'. The feature is often accompanied with Gervais's extreme frustration at the terrible quality of the clues and him encouraging Pilkington to get through the feature as quickly as possible.

Some examples are as follows:

Clue: I was walking in Texas, I fell over and my leg landed in a puddle.
Answer: Whitney Houston (Wet Knee Houston)

Clue: The Jamaican fella might have screamed this on the Titanic.  Initials:  CB.
Answer: Chris de Burgh ("Christ! De berg!")

Clue: That part of my leg is English. Initials: B.
Answer: Britney (Brit-Knee)

For the XFM broadcasts, Rockbusters was not typically prefaced with an introductory "jingle" (usually a phrase shouted by Gervais) like some other features such as Monkey News.  However, for the podcasts, Ricky would introduce the segment by screaming, "Rockbusters!" in the style of Block Buster! by Sweet.

Educating Ricky
Introduced along with Rockbusters on 12 October 2002 and lasting throughout the autumn, Educating Ricky was a feature in which Karl tries to teach Ricky several facts every week by catching his attention with a made-up headline, usually a pun. At the time, Gervais described Educating Ricky as being his favourite segment because the puns often left him in hysterics. Some classic stories include a man who was abducted by aliens for three days and he grew a beard, a man who was beheaded and his corpse took 32 steps after decapitation, the infamous tale of the hairy Chinese kid and the origin of the phrase "don't let the cat out of the bag".

Fan Mail
Described mockingly by Merchant as their "biggest fan" although "not afraid to offer some constructive criticism", someone calling himself Richard Anderson would e-mail the show regularly in the early days of the Xfm show. His first mail was read by Steve in the 2 November 2002 episode: "Ricky, your show is appalling. Are you actually aware you are on the radio or has someone just secretly stuck a microphone on you?" Ricky and Steve from then on referred to him as Dickie Anders, Dickers, The Dick Machine, The Dickmeister General, The Big Dick and several other nickname variations.

Another listener calling himself Paul "The Party Animal" Parker would send in various facts and news stories during the early podcasts in late 2005/early 2006. Gervais immediately picked up on his self-proclaimed nickname, and imagined he looked like Milhouse from The Simpsons.

Songs of Phrase
This competition, initially named Crosswords before adopting a listener's suggestion to use a play on words from BBC's Songs of Praise, was introduced when Karl was finding it hard to come up with new Rockbusters clues. A well-known phrase from the show, such as "You never see an old man having a Twix" was split up into words of different songs. The competition was to guess the songs played. In this instance Gerry & The Pacemakers' cover of Rodgers and Hammerstein's "You'll Never Walk Alone" made up the first two words of the phrase. Problems arose in this case when Karl couldn't find a song with "Twix" in it, and so he substituted the alternative chocolate bar "Mars", using the lyrics to David Bowie's "Life on Mars". Songs of Phrase was a feature present throughout the later series of the XFM shows.

The quality of this contest varied greatly from broadcast to broadcast, sometimes drawing praise from Gervais and Merchant when they felt Karl had done an especially good job picking the songs and editing them together.  Other times, they felt the phrase was too elaborate and/or the editing of the songs was too muddled for the listeners to clearly understand.  On such occasions, Karl would draw harsh criticism from Ricky and Steve, and Ricky would threaten to cancel the feature.

White Van Karl
At the time, The Sun ran a feature called "White Van Man" whereby questions on the stories of that week were put to white van drivers across the country, just to gain an insight into their views and opinions. Stephen Merchant posed the same questions to Karl, to find out more about him. The best aspect of this was Karl's bizarre beliefs and theories. Gervais and Merchant also found humour in the very mundane answers the White Van Man of the week would give. This feature was mainly used as a way to introduce new listeners to the mind of Karl Pilkington and was only used during the earlier days of the XFM shows.

Karl's Diary
Karl started keeping a record of his thoughts and experiences whilst on holiday in Gran Canaria with his girlfriend, Suzanne. The segment first appeared in episode 8 of the Guardian Unlimited podcasts (23 January 2006). Karl compared his literary efforts to those of Anne Frank, claiming that "If she's sat in a, you know, a loft knockin' stuff up, not much goin' on in 'er life at that point, yet she was still writin' it down...I thought well I'm on holiday an' I have got stuff goin' on...start a diary".

Gervais and Merchant were amused when Karl first showed them the diary, revealing to be a large desk-diary and not a smaller pocket-diary that would have been easier to carry.  Gervais correctly predicted that the extracts from Karl's diary would become an instant hit with fans, and encouraged Pilkington's efforts to maintain a record of his thoughts and experiences.  Gervais and Merchant often lapsed into fits of hysteria while reading Karl's diary owing to the absurd, pedantic, and often mindless nature of Karl's day-to-day experiences (such as rescuing insects from a swimming pool, watching a local cat lick its testicles and going to the cobbler's).

Memorable diary moments include: conceptualizing a wristwatch that counts down the remainder of your life, the large number of cross-eyed people at the hotel on Gran Canaria, a cat licking its testicles outside of a pub, a bar called "Tattoos" where the landlord did not appear to have any visible tattoos but Karl "never saw the landlord's wife", the time Karl refused to wash his hands after eating lemon cake at Ricky's house leading to a major argument, Karl thinking that both himself and Ricky Gervais are bored when they go to meetings as "after twenty minutes he (Ricky) was trying to wrestle me to the ground", Karl's idea for a television program Look what we can do with Science in which parts of a person's body are gradually removed until just the head remains, the post Karl received that was addressed to "Mr. K. Dilkington", the time Karl was carrying a lamp and wastebasket while moving to a new house and people thought he was a novelty entrant in a marathon, the tongue twister "if you can't treat a cheerful tramp, what sort of tramp can you treat?", certain tribes of cavemen allegedly waving their "tackle" (genitals) about when they want visitors to leave, and the 'experimental' mirrored wall in Karl's flat that he has partially covered with wallpaper.

For the third series of the podcasts, Pilkington’s diary focused mainly on his experiences in the hospital while being treated for kidney stones. Also in this series, Karl became intrigued with poetry and would occasionally author brief poems based on his daily experiences and learnings.  Gervais and Merchant were both shocked and delighted by Pilkington's foray into poetry. Poetry topics included jellyfish, being in the hospital, the body of a caveman allegedly discovered with hair gel in his hair, and blind moths.

Gervais usually introduced the diary segments with the jingle, “Oh, I don’t believe it! He’s only gone and written it down!” This was sometimes followed by muttered obscenities in similar fashion to the Monkey News jingle.

Shows taglines and multiple occurrences

As part of the comedy, Stephen Merchant and Ricky Gervais bullied Karl – claiming that "he's got a head like a fucking orange". In the NME test Radio Broadcast Stephen Merchant claims he met a man in Vietnam who shouted at him, "Oy oy, Karl Pilkington's got a head like a fucking orange". Moreover, Gervais would routinely insult Karl by using some varying collection of the words "little", "stupid", "bald", "Manc" and "twat". Other phrases include "I don't understand" often referring to Karl's preposterous ideas and theories, or "play a record" in an attempt to bring a link to a quick end, usually due to the ridiculousness of whatever Karl is saying. More recently, after a particularly nonsensical statement or one containing no evidence, Ricky will repeatedly state "It's unbelievable", or simply yell "Bollocks!" Ricky also routinely says "You're talking shit" when Karl says something particularly ridiculous, often during Monkey News. Despite Gervais being his primary antagonist, in the XFM shows Karl would sometimes lash out at the more patient Merchant, commenting on his gangly appearance and, at the time, lack of success with women, with Gervais often egging the pair on with comments such as 'he's done you again!' Karl also often mumbles "I'm sick of it" or, alternatively, "...sick of it," after he expresses one of his grievances (such as "useless" animals or human nature). He also asks "Do we need 'em?" when discussing an animal or thing he deems unnecessary. He also says "Forget it" when Ricky and Stephen dismiss a statement of his out of hand. During the XFM shows, some of the more explicit taglines would have to be altered as to not create trouble with the "radio authorities". The use of profanities on the show would often make Karl uneasy and worried.

Other features

Music-specific features
As music was played on the XFM show, Gervais and Merchant often came up with "features" for choosing songs to play. Some of the frequent ones include:

A Song for the Lovers was a feature Gervais ran in the days of the XFM show where he played a favourite song of his which he dedicated it to couples listening.

A Song for the Ladies was a feature Merchant ran, similar to Gervais's feature, however as he is single he would dedicate a favourite song of his to the ladies listening.

Hip Hop Hooray was another Merchant feature originally entitled "That Hip-Hop Track". He would play a track of the hip-hop genre to Gervais and Karl. In one show, Jonathan Ross popped in live on the air to give Gervais some tickets to an Awards Ceremony, and claimed that Hip Hop Hooray was the "worst feature on British radio" featuring "instantly forgettable" songs.

That Film Sounds Good was a feature run by Gervais, where he picked a song from a film and played that (not to be confused with his film review).

Under the Covers/Run for Cover/Cover Me Up/Duck for Cover/Cover Me Bad/Between The Covers/OOh You Got Me Covered/OOh I Like Covers/Here Come The Covers/Mmmm Covers/This Was Done By Someone Else/I Like Cover Songs was most commonly a Merchant feature in which he simply played a cover version of a famous song. The feature was short lived.

Songs That I'd Like To Play/Songs That I Like/Song's That I'd Like To Hear on the Radio was a Merchant feature in which (as explained by Gervais) they admit that there are a lot of songs in the world, but that for this particular feature, you will only hear songs that Merchant likes.

Notable short-lived features
The Education of Karl: Following the revelation of Karl's GCSE results, a sole E in History, Gervais decides to give Karl a piece of homework, usually a short biography of an important historic figure, which Karl must report on each week. Subjects included Rasputin, Che Guevara, Hitler, Winston Churchill and Aesop's Fables. Karl soon became bored and annoyed with his homework since it reminded him of school, and abandoned the feature. This was one of the first recurring features, along with White Van Karl, which principally revolved around Karl relating his opinions on various topics.

Song with a Story: This feature ran in the final shows of XFM. Karl doesn't particularly enjoy a song unless it has a story to go with it, and in this feature he chose one of his favourite songs with a story and would play them on the show. The songs were often accompanied by commentary from Gervais, Merchant and Karl. A classic example of this feature is when Karl believed that Eric Clapton's "Wonderful Tonight" was about a disabled man in a wheel chair, while having little evidence for this belief.
Perhaps the most notable song included in this feature is Rod Stewart's "The Killing of Georgie", which Karl says is his favourite song.

Do We Need 'Em?: A feature from the middle years of the XFM series, which originally was simply called 'Pilkington' where Karl interviewed a woman who claimed to have had a ghostly experience, prompting him to ask "You're not on crack?". This morphed into Do We Need 'Em?, in which Karl would call an animal expert and argue for the extinction of a certain animal species, which he felt was useless and "getting in the way". Karl became dismayed by the opposition he faced from the experts, believing there was a conspiracy to keep every animal from extinction, and thus ended the feature. At the beginning and end of the feature, the theme tune to Michael Parkinson's chat show was played.

Cheap as Chimps: Karl provides information concerning the economy of raising apes. As with several other of his short-lived features, Karl had come up with the title before the actual concept of the feature, and it was discontinued when Karl, upon viewing a most likely illegal animal poaching website, realised that raising chimps wasn't as cheap as he'd originally hoped. After dropping the feature Karl became convinced that Donal MacIntyre had stolen "Cheap as Chimps" and put it on Channel Five. The Donal McIntyre show was in fact called "The Trade in Rare Mountain Gorillas – Rwanda" and was broadcast as part of his MacIntyre Investigates series, televised in April 2003.

Cheeky Freak of the Week: For this feature, Karl discussed his favourite freak of the week chosen from the tabloids, internet or the Fortean Times. Cheeky Freak of the Week was a relatively short-lived feature, which only existed during the earlier days of the XFM shows. Karl ended up having to stop this feature as he was worried about people thinking he was "having a go".

Karl's Film Quiz: This feature involved a clip of a famous film with Karl's voice dubbed over one of the main character's. He would often change the storyline and chronology of the film to match recent events in his life. At the end, Karl would ask a trivia question relating to the film, and would typically award a prize to a listener who e-mailed in the correct answer.  The prize was usually a VHS copy of the film featured in the segment. Gervais and Merchant often made fun awarding VHS tapes as prizes, complaining that Karl and XFM were too cheap to purchase the films on DVD. The feature also was never given a proper name and Karl often described it as merely 'the film thing'. However, this feature was a consistent favourite of both Gervais and Merchant. Films featured in the segment included: The Graduate, Pulp Fiction, The Shining, When Harry Met Sally..., Kes, and A Few Good Men.

Ricky's World-Famous Film Review: Gervais's film review was one of the earliest features included in the show in which he reviewed a film he had recently seen. Often the reviews contained very little opinion and were often just a summary of what had happened in the film. Gervais almost always gave films 9/10. He decided to end this feature because he wanted his average film score to stay as 9.5/10. The last film Gervais reviewed was The Lord of the Rings: The Fellowship of the Ring, which he hadn't even seen at the time, claiming "Robbie Coltrane is probably in it, because he's in that 'other one' "; Gervais still gave the film a 9/10 even though he said "It's about wizards called Gonads with beards."

References

External links

The Ricky Gervais Show website
Official Ricky Gervais website

The Guardian
2001 radio programme debuts
2005 podcast debuts
Audio podcasts
Comedy and humor podcasts
Podcasts adapted into television shows
British podcasts
Ricky Gervais